Sapphire Wind Farm is a 270 megawatt (MW) wind farm in the Australian state of New South Wales. When it was built in 2018, it was the largest wind farm in New South Wales. It is located in the New England region of northern New South Wales, 28 kilometres east of Inverell and 18 kilometres west of Glen Innes. The farm covers approximately 8921 hectares of cleared grazing land, and has an elevation of about 750 to 1100m. It is north of the Gwydir Highway. The White Rock and Glen Innes Wind Farms are south of the highway closer to Glen Innes. It is intended to be colocated with a 200 MW solar farm. The wind farm contains 75 Vestas V126 turbines, each of which can generate 3.6 MW of electricity. They each have a 137 metre hub height and 126 metre rotor diameter. The project is approved to build up to 109 wind turbines.

Operations 
The wind farm began grid commissioning in February 2018 and was fully commissioned in November 2018 and has operated continuously since then. The generation table uses eljmkt nemlog to obtain generation values for each month.

Note: Asterisk indicates power output was limited during the month.

References

Wind farms in New South Wales